John Ryman QC (7 November 1930 – 3 May 2009) was a British Labour Party Member of Parliament (MP) who sat as an independent MP for his last year in the House of Commons.

Ryman was educated at Leighton Park School, Reading, and Pembroke College, Oxford. Ryman was a barrister and a fox-hunter. He was elected MP for Blyth in the October 1974 general election, ousting the incumbent Eddie Milne (who had been re-elected as an Independent Labour MP at the February 1974 election after being deselected as the official Labour candidate). In 1976 was fined £400 in under the Representation of the People Act 1949 and the Perjury Act 1911 for falsifying his election expenses return and overspending, although the election result stood.

In a close Parliament, Ryman's frequent absences from Parliament (either to continue his legal work or for other reasons) tried the patience of the whips. On one celebrated occasion the Chief Whip Bob Mellish went on the radio to ask listeners to get in touch if they had spotted him.

When the German Social Democrat Helmut Schmidt urged the Labour Party to support British membership of the EEC, Ryman responded with "Why should this patronising Hun lecture the British Labour Party?"

Ryman held off a strong challenge from Milne in the 1979 general election, holding his seat with a majority of over 7,000. The constituency was renamed Blyth Valley for the 1983 general election, when the newly formed Social Democratic Party (SDP) cut his majority to 3,243. In 1986, he announced that he was leaving the Labour Party and sat as an independent until he retired at the 1987 general election. His successor was Ronnie Campbell.

On 23 April 1992 Ryman was convicted of defrauding two women of their life savings. He had pretended to be the director of a Swiss bank and told the women that they would get 22·5% interest, but in fact paid the money to his ex-wife for maintenance payments. Ryman was given a two-and-a-half-year jail sentence.

Personal life
Ryman was a former husband of Shirley Summerskill, another Labour MP. They married in 1957 but had divorced by the time he entered Parliament. He was married five times in all. He claimed to have invested some money belonging to his fifth wife Nicola, a wealthy widow, in a high-yield Swiss bank account but in fact squandered the money on a horse, Jaguar car and holidays on the Orient Express. He had previously narrowly escaped being prosecuted by the family of a mistress whose money he had also claimed to have invested in a Swiss account.

Notes

References
 Times Guide to the House of Commons 1983
 Richard Duce, "Ex-MP jailed for swindling women" (The Times, 24 April 1992)
 The Almanac of British Politics 1999

1930 births
2009 deaths
English fraudsters
British politicians convicted of fraud
Independent politicians in England
Labour Party (UK) MPs for English constituencies
Independent members of the House of Commons of the United Kingdom
UK MPs 1974–1979
UK MPs 1979–1983
UK MPs 1983–1987
People educated at Leighton Park School
Alumni of Pembroke College, Oxford
20th-century English businesspeople
Spouses of British politicians